Bertha Pauline Dutton (born in Algona, Iowa, on March 29, 1903; died September 11, 1994) was an American anthropologist and ethnologist specializing in the American Southwest and Mesoamerica. She was one of the first female archeologists to work with the National Park Service.

Life

Early years 
Dutton was the only child of farmers Orrin Judd Dutton and Fannie B. Stewart.

Dutton's favorite high school subjects were history, classical art and literature. She was enrolled at the Lincoln (Nebraska) School of Commerce and the University of Nebraska from 1929 to 1931. She worked as a bank clerk and had other jobs, and she initially prepared herself for a career in similar fields, but fate intervened. After she was accidentally hit by a car one evening, she had to recuperate in the hospital for several weeks. While there, one of her visiting teachers suggested that Dutton might enjoy attending the University of New Mexico to study anthropology, which seemed more in line with her interests. She took the advice and began her studies there in 1932.

She worked as secretary in the university's Anthropology Department from 1933-1936 and after graduation, the noted anthropologist Edgar Lee Hewett hired her at the Museum of New Mexico (MNM) in Santa Fe, New Mexico in 1936.

As Dutton was serving as Hewett's administrative assistant, she convinced him that the museum needed more than archeology exhibits. She proposed that ethnology exhibits should accompany those on archaeology and Hewett agreed, promoting her to museum curator of ethnology in 1939.

Museum curator 
Hewett had hired her, along with Marjorie Ferguson (1908–2006), after he had trained both of them at the University of New Mexico. According to Fowler, "Both women spent their careers at the MNM as museum anthropologists, a specialization seen by some academic anthropologists as jobs best suited for women because, according to Yale University professor Clark Wissler, of their "natural housekeeping skills." But both made significant contributions to Southwest research in archaeology, ethnology, and history, while also educating the public." Dutton was curator of ethnology from 1939 to 1959, curator of interpretive exhibits until 1962 and head of the Division of Research until her retirement in 1965. In addition, Dutton taught the museum's television and adult education classes from 1947 to 1957 while remaining a research associate with the Museum of New Mexico until the end of her life. Meanwhile, in 1952, Dutton earned her PhD at Columbia University.

Her excavation projects included Chaco Canyon (Leyit Kin), in the Galisteo Basin (Pueblo Largo, Las Madres), and in the Salinas area (Abó). She also excavated in Mexico and Guatemala using her joint appointment as a research associate of the School of American Research (now School for Advanced Research).

Outreach efforts 
As part of her efforts to spread interest about anthropology and ethnology to the public, "she led 27 archaeological mobile and excavation camps for Senior Girl Scouts (aged fifteen to eighteen) between 1947 and 1957, introducing nearly 300 girls from throughout the nation to the anthropology of the Southwest". This program resulted in several of these young women pursuing advanced degrees in anthropology and related fields.

After retiring in 1965 from the MNM, Dutton was named director of the Museum of Navajo Ceremonial Art (now Wheelwright Museum of the American Indian), where she worked for ten years.

She died in 1994.

Selected publications
 Łeyit Kin, a small house ruin, Chaco Canyon, New Mexico; excavation report, 1938
 The Jemez Mountain region, 1938
 A history of plumbate ware, 1942
 Excavations at Tajumulco, Guatemala, 1943
 The Pueblo Indian world: studies on the natural history of the Río Grande Valley in relation to Pueblo Indian culture, 1945
 Indian arts and crafts of the Southwest in the Santa Fe Indian Village, Chicago Railroad Fair, 1948
 The Toltecs and their influence on the culture of Chichen Itza, 1951
 Highlights of the Jémez region, 1952
 Pocket handbook, New Mexico Indians, 1953
 New Mexico Indians and their Arizona neighbors, 1955
 Tula of the Toltecs, 1955
 Indian artistry in wood and other media: an exhibition in the Hall of ethnology, Museum of New Mexico, 1957
 Navaho ceremonies, 1958?
 An archaeological survey of the proposed Galisteo Dam and Reservoir, 196?
 Indians of the Southwest, 1961
 Santa Fe area, 1962
 Indian villages, past & present, 1962
 Happy people: the Huichol Indians, 1962
 Sun Father's way; the Kiva murals of Kuaua; a Pueblo ruin, Coronado State Monument, New Mexico, 1963
 Friendly people: the Zuñi Indians, 1963
 New Mexico Indian reservations and pueblos., 1964
 New Mexico's Indians of today, 1964
 Let's explore Indian villages, past & present. Tour guide for Santa Fe area, 1970
 Navajo weaving today,, 1975
 Indians of the American Southwest, 1976
 The Pueblos, 1977
 The Ranchería, Ute, and Southern Paiute peoples, 1977
 The Laguna calendar, 1977
 Navahos and Apaches: the Athabascan peoples, 1977
 Navajo, Pima, Apache, 1978
 Hopi, Acoma, Tewa, Zuni, 1986
 Navajo, Pima, Apache, 1986
 Myths et legends of the Indians of the SouthwestnBook I, Hopi, Acoma, Tewa, Zuni, 1987
 Myths et legends of the Indians of the SouthwestnBook II, Navajo, Pima, Apache, 1987

References 

People from Algona, Iowa
American ethnologists
Mesoamerican archaeologists
American women archaeologists
Women ethnologists
1903 births
1994 deaths
20th-century American non-fiction writers
20th-century American women writers